Manja Rogan (born 22 October 1995) is a Slovenian football midfielder currently playing for ŽNK Olimpija Ljubljana in the Slovenian Women's League. She previously played for Pomurje and has featured regularly in the UEFA Women's Champions League.

International goals

References

External links
 

1995 births
Living people
Slovenian women's footballers
Women's association football midfielders
Slovenia women's international footballers
ŽNK Mura players
People from Murska Sobota